Myrna is the anglicized form of the Irish name Muirne and may refer to:

Myrna Anselma (1936–2008), Dutch Antillean fencer
Myrna Blyth (born 1939), American editor and writer
Myrna Brown (1959–2007), African-American singer and songwriter best known as Screechy Peach
Myrna Clark, New Democratic Party candidate, Canada
Myrna Combellack, academic researcher and writer of the Institute of Cornish Studies
Myrna Culbreath (born 1938), American science fiction writer
Myrna Cunningham, Miskita feminist and indigenous rights activist from Nicaragua
Myrna Dell (1924–2011), American actress, model, and writer
Myrna Dey, Canadian writer and novelist
Myrna Driedger, politician in Manitoba, Canada
Myrna Fahey (1933–1973), American actress, played Maria Crespo in Walt Disney's Zorro
Myrna Fyfe (born 1941), retired Canadian provincial level politician and hospital administrator
Myrna Gopnik, Professor Emerita of Linguistics at McGill University
Myrna Hague, Jamaican lovers rock and jazz singer and actress
Myrna Hansen (born 1934), Miss USA 1953
Myrna Herzog (born 1951), Brazilian-Israeli Viol player and conductor
Myrna Katz, former South Africa cricketer
Myrna Kostash (born 1944), Canadian writer and journalist
Myrna Lamb (born 1930), American playwright
Ludmyrna "Myrna" Lopez (born 1969), Democratic member of the City Council of Richmond, California
Myrna Lorrie (born 1940), Canadian country singer
Myrna Loy (1905–1993), American film, television and stage actress
Myrna MacAulay of Townshippers' Association, in Quebec, Canada
Myrna Mack (1949–1990), Guatemalan anthropologist
Myrna Narcisse, director general of the Ministry of Women's Condition in Haiti, died in 2010 earthquake
Myrna Opsahl, killed by the Symbionese Liberation Army
Myrna Phillips (born 1942), politician in Manitoba, Canada
Myrna Sharlow (1893–1935), American soprano in operas and concerts
Myrna Smith (1941–2010), American songwriter and singer
Myrna Summers (born 1949), Gospel Music singer, Minister of Music in Glenn Dale, Maryland
Myrna Vázquez (1935–1975), Puerto Rican actress and Boston activist
Myrna Veenstra (born 1975), former field hockey player from The Netherlands
Myrna Weber (born 1941), American model
Myrna Williams (politician) (born 1929), American political figure in Nevada
Myrna Wooders, Canadian economist, contributor to public economic theory, network theory and game theory

See also
Merna
Myna
Myra
Myrina (disambiguation)

English feminine given names